South Delta High School is a public high school in Rolling Fork, Mississippi (United States). The school serves students in grades nine through twelve.

South Delta High is part of the South Delta School District; the district serves all of Sharkey County, including the towns of Rolling Fork, Anguilla, and Cary, as well as the unincorporated areas of Delta City, Nitta Yuma, and Panther Burn. It also serves most of Issaquena County, including the town of Mayersville, the unincorporated area of Valley Park, and most of the unincorporated area of Grace.

The school's mascot is the Bulldog.
The school's colors are red, gold, and black.

Demographics
There were a total of 374 students enrolled in South Delta High during the 20062007 school year. The gender makeup of the district was 53% female and 47% male. The racial makeup of the school was 97.06% African American, 2.41% White, and 0.53% Hispanic.

Notable alumni
 Tavares Washington, American football player

See also
List of high schools in Mississippi
List of school districts in Mississippi

References

External links
South Delta High School

Public high schools in Mississippi
Schools in Sharkey County, Mississippi